Calvinism (also called the Reformed tradition, Reformed Protestantism, Reformed Christianity, or simply Reformed) is a major branch of Protestantism that follows the theological tradition and forms of Christian practice set down by John Calvin and other Reformation-era theologians. It emphasizes the sovereignty of God and the authority of the Bible.

Calvinists broke from the Roman Catholic Church in the 16th century. Calvinists differ from Lutherans (another major branch of the Reformation) on the spiritual real presence of Christ in the Lord's Supper, theories of worship, the purpose and meaning of baptism, and the use of God's law for believers, among other points. The label Calvinism can be misleading, because the religious tradition it denotes has always been diverse, with a wide range of influences rather than a single founder; however, almost all of them drew heavily from the writings of Augustine of Hippo twelve hundred years prior to the Reformation.

The namesake and founder of the movement, French reformer John Calvin, embraced Protestant beliefs in the late 1520s or early 1530s, as the earliest notions of later Reformed tradition were already espoused by Huldrych Zwingli. The movement was first called Calvinism in the early 1550s by Lutherans who opposed it. Many in the tradition find it either a nondescript or inappropriate term and prefer the term Reformed. The most important Reformed theologians include Calvin, Zwingli, Martin Bucer, William Farel, Heinrich Bullinger, Thomas Cranmer, Nicholas Ridley, Peter Martyr Vermigli, Theodore Beza, and John Knox. In the twentieth century, Abraham Kuyper, Herman Bavinck, B. B. Warfield, J. Gresham Machen, Louis Berkhof, Karl Barth, Martyn Lloyd-Jones, Cornelius Van Til, R. C. Sproul, and J. I. Packer were influential. Contemporary Reformed theologians include Albert Mohler, John MacArthur, Tim Keller, John Piper, Joel Beeke, and Michael Horton.

The Reformed tradition is largely represented by the Continental Reformed, Presbyterian, Evangelical Anglican, Congregationalist, and Reformed Baptist denominations. Several forms of ecclesiastical polity are exercised by a group of Reformed churches, including presbyterian, congregationalist, and some episcopal. The biggest Reformed association is the World Communion of Reformed Churches, with more than 100 million members in 211 member denominations around the world. More conservative Reformed federations include the World Reformed Fellowship and the International Conference of Reformed Churches.

Etymology 

Calvinism is named after John Calvin and was first used by a Lutheran theologian in 1552. Even though a common practice of the Roman Catholic Church was to name what it viewed as heresy after its founder, the term originated in Lutheran circles. Calvin denounced the designation himself:

Despite its negative connotation, this designation became increasingly popular in order to distinguish Calvinists from Lutherans and other Protestant branches that emerged later. The vast majority of churches that trace their history back to Calvin (including Presbyterians, Congregationalists, and other Calvinist churches) do not use it themselves because the designation "Reformed" is more generally accepted and preferred, especially in the English-speaking world. These churches claim to be—in accordance with John Calvin's own words—"renewed accordingly with the true order of gospel".

Since the Arminian controversy, the Reformed tradition—as a branch of Protestantism distinguished from Lutheranism—divided into two groups: Arminians and Calvinists. However, it is now rare to call Arminians a part of the Reformed tradition, with the majority of Arminians today being members of the Methodist Churches, General Baptist Churches or Pentecostal churches. While the Reformed theological tradition addresses all of the traditional topics of Christian theology, the word Calvinism is sometimes used to refer to particular Calvinist views on soteriology and predestination, which are summarized in part by the Five Points of Calvinism. Some have also argued that Calvinism as a whole stresses the sovereignty or rule of God in all things including salvation.

History 

The first wave of reformist theologians include Huldrych Zwingli (1484–1531), Martin Bucer (1491–1551), Wolfgang Capito (1478–1541), John Oecolampadius (1482–1531), and Guillaume Farel (1489 – 1565). While from diverse academic backgrounds, their work already contained key themes within Reformed theology, especially the priority of scripture as a source of authority. Scripture was also viewed as a unified whole, which led to a covenantal theology of the sacraments of baptism and the Lord's Supper as visible signs of the covenant of grace. Another shared perspective was their denial of the Real presence of Christ in the Eucharist. Each understood salvation to be by grace alone and affirmed a doctrine of unconditional election, the teaching that some people are chosen by God to be saved. Martin Luther and his successor, Philipp Melanchthon were significant influences on these theologians, and to a larger extent, those who followed. The doctrine of justification by faith alone, also known as sola fide,  was a direct inheritance from Luther.

The second generation featured John Calvin (1509–1564), Heinrich Bullinger (1504–1575), Wolfgang Musculus (1497–1563), Peter Martyr Vermigli (1500–1562), and Andreas Hyperius (1511–1564). Written between 1536 and 1539, Calvin's Institutes of the Christian Religion was one of the most influential works of the era. Toward the middle of the 16th century, these beliefs were formed into one consistent creed, which would shape the future definition of the Reformed faith. The 1549 Consensus Tigurinus unified Zwingli and Bullinger's memorialist theology of the Eucharist, which taught that it was simply a reminder of Christ's death, with Calvin's view of it as a means of grace with Christ actually present, though spiritually rather than bodily as in Catholic doctrine. The document demonstrates the diversity as well as unity in early Reformed theology, giving it a stability that enabled it to spread rapidly throughout Europe. This stands in marked contrast to the bitter controversy experienced by Lutherans prior to the 1579 Formula of Concord.

Due to Calvin's missionary work in France, his program of reform eventually reached the French-speaking provinces of the Netherlands. Calvinism was adopted in the Electorate of the Palatinate under Frederick III, which led to the formulation of the Heidelberg Catechism in 1563. This and the Belgic Confession were adopted as confessional standards in the first synod of the Dutch Reformed Church in 1571. 

In 1573, William the Silent joined the Calvinist Church. Calvinism was declared the official religion of the Kingdom of Navarre by the queen regnant Jeanne d'Albret after her conversion in 1560. Leading divines, either Calvinist or those sympathetic to Calvinism, settled in England, including Martin Bucer, Peter Martyr, and Jan Łaski, as did John Knox in Scotland. 

During the First English Civil War, English and Scots Presbyterians produced the Westminster Confession, which became the confessional standard for Presbyterians in the English-speaking world. Having established itself in Europe, the movement continued to spread to areas including North America, South Africa and Korea.

While Calvin did not live to see the foundation of his work grow into an international movement, his death allowed his ideas to spread far beyond their city of origin and their borders and to establish their own distinct character.

Spread

Although much of Calvin's work was in Geneva, his publications spread his ideas of a correctly Reformed church to many parts of Europe. In Switzerland, some cantons are still Reformed, and some are Catholic. Calvinism became the dominant doctrine within the Church of Scotland, the Dutch Republic, some communities in Flanders, and parts of Germany, especially those adjacent to the Netherlands in the Palatinate, Kassel and Lippe, spread by Olevianus and Zacharias Ursinus among others. Protected by the local nobility, Calvinism became a significant religion in Eastern Hungary and Hungarian-speaking areas of Transylvania. Today there are about 3.5 million Hungarian Reformed people worldwide.

It was influential in France, Lithuania and Poland before being mostly erased during the Counter Reformation. In Poland, a faction called the Polish Brethren broke away from Calvinism on January 22, 1556, when Piotr of Goniądz, a Polish student, spoke out against the doctrine of the Trinity during the general synod of the Reformed churches of Poland held in the village of Secemin. Calvinism gained some popularity in Scandinavia, especially Sweden, but was rejected in favor of Lutheranism after the Synod of Uppsala in 1593.

Many 17th century European settlers in the North America were Calvinist in doctrine, who emigrated because of arguments over church structure, like the Pilgrim Fathers, or were forced into exile, such as the French Huguenots. Dutch and French Calvinist settlers were also among the first European colonizers of South Africa, beginning in the 17th century, who became known as Boers or Afrikaners.

Sierra Leone was largely colonized by Calvinist settlers from Nova Scotia, many of whom were Black Loyalists who fought for the British Empire during the American War of Independence. John Marrant had organized a congregation there under the auspices of the Huntingdon Connection. Some of the largest Calvinist communions were started by 19th- and 20th-century missionaries. Especially large are those in Indonesia, Korea and Nigeria. In South Korea there are 20,000 Presbyterian congregations with about 9–10 million church members, scattered in more than 100 Presbyterian denominations. In South Korea, Presbyterianism is the largest Christian denomination.

A 2011 report of the Pew Forum on Religious and Public Life estimated that members of Presbyterian or Reformed churches make up 7% of the estimated 801 million Protestants globally, or approximately 56 million people. Though the broadly defined Reformed faith is much larger, as it constitutes Congregationalist (0.5%), most of the United and uniting churches (unions of different denominations) (7.2%) and most likely some of the other Protestant denominations (38.2%). All three are distinct categories from Presbyterian or Reformed (7%) in this report.

The Reformed family of churches is one of the largest Christian denominations. According to adherents.com the Reformed/Presbyterian/Congregational/United churches represent 75 million believers worldwide.

The World Communion of Reformed Churches, which includes some United Churches (most of these are primarily Reformed; see Uniting and united churches for details), has 80 million believers. WCRC is the third largest Christian communion in the world, after the Roman Catholic Church and the Eastern Orthodox Churches.

Many conservative Reformed churches which are strongly Calvinistic formed the World Reformed Fellowship which has about 70 member denominations. Most are not part of the World Communion of Reformed Churches because of its ecumenical attire. The International Conference of Reformed Churches is another conservative association.

Church of Tuvalu is an officially established state church in the Calvinist tradition.

Theology

Revelation and scripture

Reformed theologians believe that God communicates knowledge of himself to people through the Word of God. People are not able to know anything about God except through this self-revelation. (With the exception of general revelation of God; "His invisible attributes, His eternal power and divine nature, have been clearly seen, being understood through what has been made, so that they are without excuse" (Romans 1:20).) Speculation about anything which God has not revealed through his Word is not warranted. The knowledge people have of God is different from that which they have of anything else because God is infinite, and finite people are incapable of comprehending an infinite being. While the knowledge revealed by God to people is never incorrect, it is also never comprehensive.

According to Reformed theologians, God's self-revelation is always through his son Jesus Christ, because Christ is the only mediator between God and people. Revelation of God through Christ comes through two basic channels. The first is creation and providence, which is God's creating and continuing to work in the world. This action of God gives everyone knowledge about God, but this knowledge is only sufficient to make people culpable for their sin; it does not include knowledge of the gospel. The second channel through which God reveals himself is redemption, which is the gospel of salvation from condemnation which is punishment for sin.

In Reformed theology, the Word of God takes several forms. Jesus Christ himself is the Word Incarnate. The prophecies about him said to be found in the Old Testament and the ministry of the apostles who saw him and communicated his message are also the Word of God. Further, the preaching of ministers about God is the very Word of God because God is considered to be speaking through them. God also speaks through human writers in the Bible, which is composed of texts set apart by God for self-revelation. Reformed theologians emphasize the Bible as a uniquely important means by which God communicates with people. People gain knowledge of God from the Bible which cannot be gained in any other way.

Reformed theologians affirm that the Bible is true, but differences emerge among them over the meaning and extent of its truthfulness. Conservative followers of the Princeton theologians take the view that the Bible is true and inerrant, or incapable of error or falsehood, in every place. This view is very similar to that of Catholic orthodoxy as well as modern Evangelicalism. Another view, influenced by the teaching of Karl Barth and neo-orthodoxy, is found in the Presbyterian Church (U.S.A.)'s Confession of 1967. Those who take this view believe the Bible to be the primary source of our knowledge of God, but also that some parts of the Bible may be false, not witnesses to Christ, and not normative for today's church. In this view, Christ is the revelation of God, and the scriptures witness to this revelation rather than being the revelation itself.

Covenant theology

Reformed theologians use the concept of covenant to describe the way God enters into fellowship with people in history. The concept of covenant is so prominent in Reformed theology that Reformed theology as a whole is sometimes called "covenant theology". However, sixteenth- and seventeenth-century theologians developed a particular theological system called "covenant theology" or "federal theology" which many conservative Reformed churches continue to affirm today. This framework orders God's life with people primarily in two covenants: the covenant of works and the covenant of grace.

The covenant of works is made with Adam and Eve in the Garden of Eden. The terms of the covenant are that God provides a blessed life in the garden on condition that Adam and Eve obey God's law perfectly. Because Adam and Eve broke the covenant by eating the forbidden fruit, they became subject to death and were banished from the garden. This sin was passed down to all mankind because all people are said to be in Adam as a covenantal or "federal" head. Federal theologians usually infer that Adam and Eve would have gained immortality had they obeyed perfectly.

A second covenant, called the covenant of grace, is said to have been made immediately following Adam and Eve's sin. In it, God graciously offers salvation from death on condition of faith in God. This covenant is administered in different ways throughout the Old and New Testaments, but retains the substance of being free of a requirement of perfect obedience.

Through the influence of Karl Barth, many contemporary Reformed theologians have discarded the covenant of works, along with other concepts of federal theology. Barth saw the covenant of works as disconnected from Christ and the gospel, and rejected the idea that God works with people in this way. Instead, Barth argued that God always interacts with people under the covenant of grace, and that the covenant of grace is free of all conditions whatsoever. Barth's theology and that which follows him has been called "monocovenantal" as opposed to the "bi-covenantal" scheme of classical federal theology. Conservative contemporary Reformed theologians, such as John Murray, have also rejected the idea of covenants based on law rather than grace. Michael Horton, however, has defended the covenant of works as combining principles of law and love.

God

For the most part, the Reformed tradition did not modify the medieval consensus on the doctrine of God. God's character is described primarily using three adjectives: eternal, infinite, and unchangeable. Reformed theologians such as Shirley Guthrie have proposed that rather than conceiving of God in terms of his attributes and freedom to do as he pleases, the doctrine of God is to be based on God's work in history and his freedom to live with and empower people.

Traditionally, Reformed theologians have also followed the medieval tradition going back to before the early church councils of Nicaea and Chalcedon on the doctrine of the Trinity. God is affirmed to be one God in three persons: Father, Son, and Holy Spirit. The Son (Christ) is held to be eternally begotten by the Father and the Holy Spirit eternally proceeding from the Father and Son. However, contemporary theologians have been critical of aspects of Western views here as well. Drawing on the Eastern tradition, these Reformed theologians have proposed a "social trinitarianism" where the persons of the Trinity only exist in their life together as persons-in-relationship. Contemporary Reformed confessions such as the Barmen Confession and Brief Statement of Faith of the Presbyterian Church (USA) have avoided language about the attributes of God and have emphasized his work of reconciliation and empowerment of people. Feminist theologian Letty Russell used the image of partnership for the persons of the Trinity. According to Russell, thinking this way encourages Christians to interact in terms of fellowship rather than reciprocity. Conservative Reformed theologian Michael Horton, however, has argued that social trinitarianism is untenable because it abandons the essential unity of God in favor of a community of separate beings.

Christ and atonement

Reformed theologians affirm the historic Christian belief that Christ is eternally one person with a divine and a human nature. Reformed Christians have especially emphasized that Christ truly became human so that people could be saved. Christ's human nature has been a point of contention between Reformed and Lutheran Christology. In accord with the belief that finite humans cannot comprehend infinite divinity, Reformed theologians hold that Christ's human body cannot be in multiple locations at the same time. Because Lutherans believe that Christ is bodily present in the Eucharist, they hold that Christ is bodily present in many locations simultaneously. For Reformed Christians, such a belief denies that Christ actually became human. Some contemporary Reformed theologians have moved away from the traditional language of one person in two natures, viewing it as unintelligible to contemporary people. Instead, theologians tend to emphasize Jesus' context and particularity as a first-century Jew.

John Calvin and many Reformed theologians who followed him describe Christ's work of redemption in terms of three offices: prophet, priest, and king. Christ is said to be a prophet in that he teaches perfect doctrine, a priest in that he intercedes to the Father on believers' behalf and offered himself as a sacrifice for sin, and a king in that he rules the church and fights on believers' behalf. The threefold office links the work of Christ to God's work in ancient Israel. Many, but not all, Reformed theologians continue to make use of the threefold office as a framework because of its emphasis on the connection of Christ's work to Israel. They have, however, often reinterpreted the meaning of each of the offices. For example, Karl Barth interpreted Christ's prophetic office in terms of political engagement on behalf of the poor.

Christians believe Jesus' death and resurrection makes it possible for believers to receive forgiveness for sin and reconciliation with God through the atonement. Reformed Protestants generally subscribe to a particular view of the atonement called penal substitutionary atonement, which explains Christ's death as a sacrificial payment for sin. Christ is believed to have died in place of the believer, who is accounted righteous as a result of this sacrificial payment.

Sin

In Christian theology, people are created good and in the image of God but have become corrupted by sin, which causes them to be imperfect and overly self-interested. Reformed Christians, following the tradition of Augustine of Hippo, believe that this corruption of human nature was brought on by Adam and Eve's first sin, a doctrine called original sin. Although earlier Christian authors taught the elements of physical death, moral weakness, and a sin propensity within original sin, Augustine was the first Christian to add the concept of inherited guilt (reatus) from Adam whereby every infant is born eternally damned and humans lack any residual ability to respond to God. Reformed theologians emphasize that this sinfulness affects all of a person's nature, including their will. This view, that sin so dominates people that they are unable to avoid sin, has been called total depravity. As a consequence, every one of their descendants inherited a stain of corruption and depravity. This condition, innate to all humans, is known in Christian theology as original sin. Calvin thought original sin was “a hereditary corruption and depravity of our nature, extending to all the parts of the soul.” Calvin asserted people were so warped by original sin that “everything which our mind conceives, meditates, plans, and resolves, is always evil.” The depraved condition of every human being is not the result of sins people commit during their lives.  Instead, before we are born, while we are in our mother's womb, “we are in God's sight defiled and polluted.” Calvin thought people were justly condemned to hell because their corrupted state is “naturally hateful to God.”

In colloquial English, the term "total depravity" can be easily misunderstood to mean that people are absent of any goodness or unable to do any good. However the Reformed teaching is actually that while people continue to bear God's image and may do things that appear outwardly good, their sinful intentions affect all of their nature and actions so that they are not pleasing to God. From a Calvinist viewpoint, a person who has sinned was predestined to sin, and no matter what a person does, they will go to Heaven or Hell based on that determination. There is no repenting from sin since the most evil thing is the sinner's own actions, thoughts, and words.

Some contemporary theologians in the Reformed tradition, such as those associated with the Presbyterian Church (USA)'s Confession of 1967, have emphasized the social character of human sinfulness. These theologians have sought to bring attention to issues of environmental, economic, and political justice as areas of human life that have been affected by sin.

Salvation

Reformed theologians, along with other Protestants, believe salvation from punishment for sin is to be given to all those who have faith in Christ. Faith is not purely intellectual, but involves trust in God's promise to save. Protestants do not hold there to be any other requirement for salvation, but that faith alone is sufficient.

Justification is the part of salvation where God pardons the sin of those who believe in Christ. It is historically held by Protestants to be the most important article of Christian faith, though more recently it is sometimes given less importance out of ecumenical concerns. People are not on their own able to fully repent of their sin or prepare themselves to repent because of their sinfulness. Therefore, justification is held to arise solely from God's free and gracious act.

Sanctification is the part of salvation in which God makes the believer holy, by enabling them to exercise greater love for God and for other people. The good works accomplished by believers as they are sanctified are considered to be the necessary outworking of the believer's salvation, though they do not cause the believer to be saved. Sanctification, like justification, is by faith, because doing good works is simply living as the child of God one has become.

Predestination

Reformed theologians teach that sin so affects human nature that they are unable even to exercise faith in Christ by their own will. While people are said to retain will, in that they willfully sin, they are unable not to sin because of the corruption of their nature due to original sin. Reformed Christians believe that God predestined some people to be saved and others were predestined to eternal damnation. This choice by God to save some is held to be unconditional and not based on any characteristic or action on the part of the person chosen. This view is opposed to the Arminian view that God's choice of whom to save is conditional or based on his foreknowledge of who would respond positively to God.

Karl Barth reinterpreted the Reformed doctrine of predestination to apply only to Christ. Individual people are only said to be elected through their being in Christ. Reformed theologians who followed Barth, including Jürgen Moltmann, David Migliore, and Shirley Guthrie, have argued that the traditional Reformed concept of predestination is speculative and have proposed alternative models. These theologians claim that a properly trinitarian doctrine emphasizes God's freedom to love all people, rather than choosing some for salvation and others for damnation. God's justice towards and condemnation of sinful people is spoken of by these theologians as out of his love for them and a desire to reconcile them to himself.

Five Points of Calvinism
Much attention surrounding Calvinism focuses on the "Five Points of Calvinism" (also called the doctrines of grace). The five points have been summarized under the acrostic TULIP. The five points are popularly said to summarize the Canons of Dort; however, there is no historical relationship between them, and some scholars argue that their language distorts the meaning of the Canons, Calvin's theology, and the theology of 17th-century Calvinistic orthodoxy, particularly in the language of total depravity and limited atonement. The five points were more recently popularized in the 1963 booklet The Five Points of Calvinism Defined, Defended, Documented by David N. Steele and Curtis C. Thomas. The origins of the five points and the acrostic are uncertain, but they appear to be outlined in the Counter Remonstrance of 1611, a lesser-known Reformed reply to the Arminians, which was written prior to the Canons of Dort. The acrostic was used by Cleland Boyd McAfee as early as circa 1905. An early printed appearance of the acrostic can be found in Loraine Boettner's 1932 book, The Reformed Doctrine of Predestination.

The central assertion of TULIP is that God saves every person upon whom he has mercy, and that his efforts are not frustrated by the unrighteousness or inability of humans.
 Total depravity (also called radical corruption or pervasive depravity) asserts that as a consequence of the fall of man into sin, every person is enslaved to sin. People are not by nature inclined to love God, but rather to serve their own interests and to reject the rule of God. Thus, all people by their own faculties are morally unable to choose to trust God for their salvation and be saved (the term "total" in this context refers to sin affecting every part of a person, not that every person is as evil as they could be). This doctrine is derived from Calvin's interpretation of Augustine's explanation about Original Sin. While the phrases "totally depraved" and "utterly perverse" were used by Calvin, what was meant was the inability to save oneself from sin rather than being absent of goodness. Phrases like "total depravity" cannot be found in the Canons of Dort, and the Canons as well as later Reformed orthodox theologians arguably offer a more moderate view of the nature of fallen humanity than Calvin.
 Unconditional election (also called sovereign election or unconditional grace) asserts that God has chosen from eternity those whom he will bring to himself not based on foreseen virtue, merit, or faith in those people; rather, his choice is unconditionally grounded in his mercy alone. God has chosen from eternity to extend mercy to those he has chosen and to withhold mercy from those not chosen. Those chosen receive salvation through Christ alone. Those not chosen receive the just wrath that is warranted for their sins against God.
 Limited atonement (also called definite atonement or particular redemption) asserts that Jesus's substitutionary atonement was definite and certain in its purpose and in what it accomplished. This implies that only the sins of the elect were atoned for by Jesus's death. Calvinists do not believe, however, that the atonement is limited in its value or power, but rather that the atonement is limited in the sense that it is intended for some and not all. Some Calvinists have summarized this as "The atonement is sufficient for all and efficient for the elect."
 Irresistible grace (also called effectual grace, effectual calling, or efficacious grace) asserts that the saving grace of God is effectually applied to those whom he has determined to save (that is, the elect) and overcomes their resistance to obeying the call of the gospel, bringing them to a saving faith. This means that when God sovereignly purposes to save someone, that individual certainly will be saved. The doctrine holds that this purposeful influence of God's Holy Spirit cannot be resisted, but that the Holy Spirit, "graciously causes the elect sinner to cooperate, to believe, to repent, to come freely and willingly to Christ." This is not to deny the fact that the Spirit's outward call (through the proclamation of the Gospel) can be, and often is, rejected by sinners; rather, it is that inward call which cannot be rejected.
 Perseverance of the saints (also called preservation of the saints; the "saints" being those whom God has predestined to salvation) asserts that since God is sovereign and his will cannot be frustrated by humans or anything else, those whom God has called into communion with himself will continue in faith until the end. Those who apparently fall away either never had true faith to begin with (1 John 2:19), or, if they are saved but not presently walking in the Spirit, they will be divinely chastened (Hebrews 12:5–11) and will repent (1 John 3:6–9).

Church

Reformed Christians see the Christian Church as the community with which God has made the covenant of grace, a promise of eternal life and relationship with God. This covenant extends to those under the "old covenant" whom God chose, beginning with Abraham and Sarah. The church is conceived of as both invisible and visible. The invisible church is the body of all believers, known only to God. The visible church is the institutional body which contains both members of the invisible church as well as those who appear to have faith in Christ, but are not truly part of God's elect.

In order to identify the visible church, Reformed theologians have spoken of certain marks of the Church. For some, the only mark is the pure preaching of the gospel of Christ. Others, including John Calvin, also include the right administration of the sacraments. Others, such as those following the Scots Confession, include a third mark of rightly administered church discipline, or exercise of censure against unrepentant sinners. These marks allowed the Reformed to identify the church based on its conformity to the Bible rather than the Magisterium or church tradition.

Worship

Regulative principle of worship

The regulative principle of worship is a teaching shared by some Calvinists and Anabaptists on how the Bible orders public worship. The substance of the doctrine regarding worship is that God institutes in the Scriptures everything he requires for worship in the Church and that everything else is prohibited. As the regulative principle is reflected in Calvin's own thought, it is driven by his evident antipathy toward the Roman Catholic Church and its worship practices, and it associates musical instruments with icons, which he considered violations of the Ten Commandments' prohibition of graven images.

On this basis, many early Calvinists also eschewed musical instruments and advocated a cappella exclusive psalmody in worship, though Calvin himself allowed other scriptural songs as well as psalms, and this practice typified Presbyterian worship and the worship of other Reformed churches for some time. The original Lord's Day service designed by John Calvin was a highly liturgical service with the Creed, Alms, Confession and Absolution, the Lord's supper, Doxologies, prayers, Psalms being sung, the Lords prayer being sung, and Benedictions.

Since the 19th century, however, some of the Reformed churches have modified their understanding of the regulative principle and make use of musical instruments, believing that Calvin and his early followers went beyond the biblical requirements and that such things are circumstances of worship requiring biblically rooted wisdom, rather than an explicit command. Despite the protestations of those who hold to a strict view of the regulative principle, today hymns and musical instruments are in common use, as are contemporary worship music styles with elements such as worship bands.

Sacraments

The Westminster Confession of Faith limits the sacraments to baptism and the Lord's Supper. Sacraments are denoted "signs and seals of the covenant of grace." Westminster speaks of "a sacramental relation, or a sacramental union, between the sign and the thing signified; whence it comes to pass that the names and effects of the one are attributed to the other." Baptism is for infant children of believers as well as believers, as it is for all the Reformed except Baptists and some Congregationalists. Baptism admits the baptized into the visible church, and in it all the benefits of Christ are offered to the baptized. On the Lord's supper, Westminster takes a position between Lutheran sacramental union and Zwinglian memorialism: "the Lord's supper really and indeed, yet not carnally and corporally, but spiritually, receive and feed upon Christ crucified, and all benefits of his death: the body and blood of Christ being then not corporally or carnally in, with, or under the bread and wine; yet, as really, but spiritually, present to the faith of believers in that ordinance as the elements themselves are to their outward senses."

The 1689 London Baptist Confession of Faith does not use the term sacrament, but describes baptism and the Lord's supper as ordinances, as do most Baptists, Calvinist or otherwise. Baptism is only for those who "actually profess repentance towards God", and not for the children of believers. Baptists also insist on immersion or dipping, in contradistinction to other Reformed Christians. The Baptist Confession describes the Lord's supper as "the body and blood of Christ being then not corporally or carnally, but spiritually present to the faith of believers in that ordinance", similarly to the Westminster Confession. There is significant latitude in Baptist congregations regarding the Lord's supper, and many hold the Zwinglian view.

Logical order of God's decree

There are two schools of thought regarding the logical order of God's decree to ordain the fall of man: supralapsarianism (from the Latin: supra, "above", here meaning "before" + lapsus, "fall") and infralapsarianism (from the Latin: infra, "beneath", here meaning "after" + lapsus, "fall"). The former view, sometimes called "high Calvinism", argues that the Fall occurred partly to facilitate God's purpose to choose some individuals for salvation and some for damnation. Infralapsarianism, sometimes called "low Calvinism", is the position that, while the Fall was indeed planned, it was not planned with reference to who would be saved.

Supralapsarians believe that God chose which individuals to save logically prior to the decision to allow the race to fall and that the Fall serves as the means of realization of that prior decision to send some individuals to hell and others to heaven (that is, it provides the grounds of condemnation in the reprobate and the need for salvation in the elect). In contrast, infralapsarians hold that God planned the race to fall logically prior to the decision to save or damn any individuals because, it is argued, in order to be "saved", one must first need to be saved from something and therefore the decree of the Fall must precede predestination to salvation or damnation.

These two views vied with each other at the Synod of Dort, an international body representing Calvinist Christian churches from around Europe, and the judgments that came out of that council sided with infralapsarianism (Canons of Dort, First Point of Doctrine, Article 7). The Westminster Confession of Faith also teaches (in Hodge's words "clearly impl[ies]") the infralapsarian view, but is sensitive to those holding to supralapsarianism. The Lapsarian controversy has a few vocal proponents on each side today, but overall it does not receive much attention among modern Calvinists.

Reformed churches
The Reformed tradition is largely represented by the Continental Reformed, Presbyterian, Evangelical Anglican, Congregationalist, and Reformed Baptist denominational families.

Continental Reformed churches

Considered to be the oldest and most orthodox bearers of the Reformed faith, the continental Reformed Churches uphold the Helvetic Confessions and Heidelberg Catechism, which were adopted in Zurich and Heidelberg, respectively. In the United States, immigrants belonging to the continental Reformed Churches joined the Dutch Reformed Church there, as well as the Anglican Church.

Congregational churches

The Congregational churches are a part of the Reformed tradition founded under the influence of New England Puritanism. The Savoy Declaration is the confession of faith held by the Congregationalist churches. An example of a Christian denomination belonging to the Congregationalist tradition is the Conservative Congregational Christian Conference.

Presbyterian churches

The Presbyterian churches are part of the Reformed tradition and were influenced by John Knox's teachings in the Church of Scotland. Presbyterianism upholds the Westminster Confession of Faith.

Evangelical Anglicanism

Historic Anglicanism is a part of the wider Reformed tradition, as "the founding documents of the Anglican church—the Book of Homilies, the Book of Common Prayer, and the Thirty-Nine Articles of Religion—expresses a theology in keeping with the Reformed theology of the Swiss and South German Reformation." The Most Rev. Peter Robinson, presiding bishop of the United Episcopal Church of North America, writes:

Reformed Baptist churches

Reformed Baptist churches are Baptists (a Christian denominational family that teaches credobaptism rather than infant baptism) who adhere to Reformed theology as explicated in the 1689 Baptist Confession of Faith.

Variants in Reformed theology

Amyraldism

Amyraldism (or sometimes Amyraldianism, also known as the School of Saumur, hypothetical universalism, post redemptionism, moderate Calvinism, or four-point Calvinism) is the belief that God, prior to his decree of election, decreed Christ's atonement for all alike if they believe, but seeing that none would believe on their own, he then elected those whom he will bring to faith in Christ, thereby preserving the Calvinist doctrine of unconditional election. The efficacy of the atonement remains limited to those who believe.

Named after its formulator Moses Amyraut, this doctrine is still viewed as a variety of Calvinism in that it maintains the particularity of sovereign grace in the application of the atonement. However, detractors like B. B. Warfield have termed it "an inconsistent and therefore unstable form of Calvinism."

Hyper-Calvinism

Hyper-Calvinism first referred to a view that appeared among the early English Particular Baptists in the 18th century. Their system denied that the call of the gospel to "repent and believe" is directed to every single person and that it is the duty of every person to trust in Christ for salvation. The term also occasionally appears in both theological and secular controversial contexts, where it usually connotes a negative opinion about some variety of theological determinism, predestination, or a version of Evangelical Christianity or Calvinism that is deemed by the critic to be unenlightened, harsh, or extreme.

The Westminster Confession of Faith says that the gospel is to be freely offered to sinners, and the Larger Catechism makes clear that the gospel is offered to the non-elect.

Neo-Calvinism

Neo-Calvinism, a form of Dutch Calvinism, is the movement initiated by the theologian and former Dutch prime minister Abraham Kuyper. James Bratt has identified a number of different types of Dutch Calvinism: The Seceders—split into the Reformed Church "West" and the Confessionalists; and the Neo-Calvinists—the Positives and the Antithetical Calvinists. The Seceders were largely infralapsarian and the Neo-Calvinists usually supralapsarian.

Kuyper wanted to awaken the church from what he viewed as its pietistic slumber. He declared:

No single piece of our mental world is to be sealed off from the rest and there is not a square inch in the whole domain of human existence over which Christ, who is sovereign over all, does not cry: 'Mine!' 

This refrain has become something of a rallying call for Neo-Calvinists.

Christian Reconstructionism

Christian Reconstructionism is a fundamentalist Calvinist theonomic movement that has remained rather obscure. Founded by R. J. Rushdoony, the movement has had an important influence on the Christian Right in the United States. The movement peaked in the 1990s. However, it lives on in small denominations such as the Reformed Presbyterian Church in the United States and as a minority position in other denominations. Christian Reconstructionists are usually postmillennialists and followers of the presuppositional apologetics of Cornelius Van Til. They tend to support a decentralized political order resulting in laissez-faire capitalism.

New Calvinism

New Calvinism is a growing perspective within conservative Evangelicalism that embraces the fundamentals of 16th century Calvinism while also trying to be relevant in the present day world. In March 2009, Time magazine described the New Calvinism as one of the "10 ideas changing the world". Some of the major figures who have been associated with the New Calvinism are John Piper, Mark Driscoll, Al Mohler, Mark Dever, C. J. Mahaney, and Tim Keller. New Calvinists have been criticized for blending Calvinist soteriology with popular Evangelical positions on the sacraments and continuationism and for rejecting tenets seen as crucial to the Reformed faith such as confessionalism and covenant theology.

Social and economic influences

Calvin expressed himself on usury in a 1545 letter to a friend, Claude de Sachin, in which he criticized the use of certain passages of scripture invoked by people opposed to the charging of interest. He reinterpreted some of these passages, and suggested that others of them had been rendered irrelevant by changed conditions. He also dismissed the argument (based upon the writings of Aristotle) that it is wrong to charge interest for money because money itself is barren. He said that the walls and the roof of a house are barren, too, but it is permissible to charge someone for allowing him to use them. In the same way, money can be made fruitful.

He qualified his view, however, by saying that money should be lent to people in dire need without hope of interest, while a modest interest rate of 5% should be permitted in relation to other borrowers.

In The Protestant Ethic and the Spirit of Capitalism, Max Weber wrote that capitalism in Northern Europe evolved when the Protestant (particularly Calvinist) ethic influenced large numbers of people to engage in work in the secular world, developing their own enterprises and engaging in trade and the accumulation of wealth for investment. In other words, the Protestant work ethic was an important force behind the unplanned and uncoordinated emergence of modern capitalism.

Expert researchers and authors have referred to the United States as a "Protestant nation" or "founded on Protestant principles," specifically emphasizing its Calvinist heritage.

Politics and society

Calvin's concepts of God and man led to ideas which were gradually put into practice after his death, in particular in the fields of politics and society. After their fight for independence from Spain (1579), the Netherlands, under Calvinist leadership, granted asylum to religious minorities, e.g. French Huguenots, English Independents (Congregationalists), and Jews from Spain and Portugal. The ancestors of the philosopher Baruch Spinoza were Portuguese Jews. Aware of the trial against Galileo, René Descartes lived in the Netherlands, out of reach of the Inquisition, from 1628 to 1649. Pierre Bayle, a Reformed Frenchman, also felt safer in the Netherlands than in his home country. He was the first prominent philosopher who demanded tolerance for atheists. Hugo Grotius (1583–1645) was able to publish a rather liberal interpretation of the Bible and his ideas about natural law in the Netherlands. Moreover, the Calvinist Dutch authorities allowed the printing of books that could not be published elsewhere, such as Galileo's Discorsi (1638).

Alongside the liberal development of the Netherlands came the rise of modern democracy in England and North America. In the Middle Ages, state and church had been closely connected. Martin Luther's doctrine of the two kingdoms separated state and church in principle. His doctrine of the priesthood of all believers raised the laity to the same level as the clergy. Going one step further, Calvin included elected laymen (church elders, presbyters) in his concept of church government. The Huguenots added synods whose members were also elected by the congregations. The other Reformed churches took over this system of church self-government, which was essentially a representative democracy. Baptists, Quakers, and Methodists are organized in a similar way. These denominations and the Anglican Church were influenced by Calvin's theology in varying degrees.

In another factor in the rise of democracy in the Anglo-American world, Calvin favored a mixture of democracy and aristocracy as the best form of government (mixed government). He appreciated the advantages of democracy. His political thought aimed to safeguard the rights and freedoms of ordinary men and women. In order to minimize the misuse of political power he suggested dividing it among several institutions in a system of checks and balances (separation of powers). Finally, Calvin taught that if worldly rulers rise up against God they should be put down. In this way, he and his followers stood in the vanguard of resistance to political absolutism and furthered the cause of democracy. The Congregationalists who founded Plymouth Colony (1620) and Massachusetts Bay Colony (1628) were convinced that the democratic form of government was the will of God. Enjoying self-rule, they practiced separation of powers. Rhode Island, Connecticut, and Pennsylvania, founded by Roger Williams, Thomas Hooker, and William Penn, respectively, combined democratic government with a limited freedom of religion that did not extend to Catholics (Congregationalism being the established, tax-supported religion in Connecticut. These colonies became safe havens for persecuted religious minorities, including Jews.)

In England, Baptists Thomas Helwys  ( 1575 –  1616), and John Smyth ( 1554–) influenced the liberal political thought of the Presbyterian poet and politician John Milton (1608–1674) and of the philosopher John Locke (1632–1704), who in turn had both a strong impact on the political development in their home country (English Civil War of 1642–1651, Glorious Revolution of 1688) as well as in North America. The ideological basis of the American Revolution was largely provided by the radical Whigs, who had been inspired by Milton, Locke, James Harrington (1611–1677), Algernon Sidney (1623–1683), and other thinkers. The Whigs' "perceptions of politics attracted widespread support in America because they revived the traditional concerns of a Protestantism that had always verged on Puritanism". The United States Declaration of Independence, the United States Constitution and (American) Bill of Rights initiated a tradition of human and civil rights that continued in the French Declaration of the Rights of Man and of the Citizen and the constitutions of numerous countries around the world, e. g. Latin America, Japan, India, Germany, and other European countries. It is also echoed in the United Nations Charter and the Universal Declaration of Human Rights.

In the 19th century, churches based on or influenced by Calvin's theology became deeply involved in social reforms, e.g. the abolition of slavery (William Wilberforce, Harriet Beecher Stowe, Abraham Lincoln, and others), women suffrage, and prison reforms. Members of these churches formed co-operatives to help the impoverished masses. The founders of the Red Cross Movement, including Henry Dunant, were Reformed Christians. Their movement also initiated the Geneva Conventions. 

Others view Calvinist influence as not always being solely positive. The Boers and Afrikaner Calvinists combined ideas from Calvinism and Kuyperian theology to justify apartheid in South Africa. As late as 1974 the majority of the Dutch Reformed Church in South Africa was convinced that their theological stances (including the story of the Tower of Babel) could justify apartheid. In 1990 the Dutch Reformed Church document Church and Society maintained that although they were changing their stance on apartheid, they believed that within apartheid and under God's sovereign guidance, "...everything was not without significance, but was of service to the Kingdom of God." These views were not universal and were condemned by many Calvinists outside South Africa. Pressure from both outside and inside the Dutch Reformed Calvinist church helped reverse apartheid in South Africa.

Throughout the world, the Reformed churches operate hospitals, homes for handicapped or elderly people, and educational institutions on all levels. For example, American Congregationalists founded Harvard (1636), Yale (1701), and about a dozen other colleges. A particular stream of influence of Calvinism concerns art. Visual art cemented society in the first modern nation state, the Netherlands, and also Neo-Calvinism put much weight on this aspect of life. Hans Rookmaaker is the most prolific example. In literature one can think of Marilynne Robinson. In her non-fiction she powerfully demonstrates the modernity of Calvin's thinking, calling him a humanist scholar (pg 174, The Death of Adam).

See also

 List of Calvinist educational institutions in North America
 List of Reformed denominations
 Synod of Jerusalem (1672): Eastern Orthodox council rejecting Calvinist beliefs
 Criticism of Protestantism
 The Protestant Ethic and the Spirit of Capitalism (1905) – Max Weber's analysis of Calvinism's influence on society and economics

Doctrine
 Common grace
 Reformed confessions of faith

Related
 Boer Calvinists: Boere-Afrikaners that hold to Reformed theology
 Huguenots: followers of Calvinism in France, originating in the 16th and 17th century
 Pilgrims: English Separatists who left Europe for America in search of religious toleration, eventually settling in New England
 Presbyterians: Calvinists in countries worldwide
 Puritans: English Protestants who wanted to purify the Church of England
 Continental Reformed church: Calvinist churches originating in continental Europe
 Waldensians: Italian Protestants, preceded Calvinism but today identify with Reformed theology

Opposing views
 Amyraldism
 Arminianism
 Catholicism
 Augustinianism
 Christian universalism
 Eastern Orthodoxy
 Palamism
 Free Grace theology
 Open theism
 Lutheranism
 Molinism
 Socinianism

Notes

References

Bibliography

 
 
 
 .
 
 
 
 .
 
 
 
 
 
 
 
 
 
 
 
 .
 
 .

Further reading

 
 
 
 Bratt, James D. (1984) Dutch Calvinism in Modern America: A History of a Conservative Subculture excerpt and text search
 
 Hart, D.G. (2013). Calvinism: A History. New Haven, CT: Yale University Press, excerpt and text search

External links

 
 "Five Points of Calvinism" by Robert Lewis Dabney (PDF).

 
Calvinist theology
Trinitarianism